Ahmose is an Ancient Egyptian name meaning "The Moon is born" or "Child of the Moon". It was a very popular name in the beginning of the eighteenth dynasty.

The name may refer to:

Pharaohs
 Senakhtenre Ahmose (died c. 1560 or 1558 BC), pharaoh of the seventeenth dynasty of Egypt
 Ahmose I (reigned c. 1550 BC – c. 1525 BC), pharaoh and founder of the eighteenth dynasty of Egypt
 Amasis II (or Ahmose II), (reigned c. 570 BC – c. 526 BC), pharaoh of the twenty-sixth dynasty of Egypt

Queens
 Ahmose-Henuttamehu (fl. c. late-16th century BC), daughter of Seqenenre Tao
 Ahmose Inhapi (or Ahmose-Inhapy) (fl. c. mid-16th century BC), daughter of Pharaoh Senakhtenre Ahmose
 Ahmose-Nefertari (c. 1560 BC – c. 1500 BC), daughter of Seqenenre Tao and Ahhotep I
 Ahmose-Meritamun (or Ahmose-Meritamon), (fl. c. late-16th century BC), daughter of Ahmose I and Ahmose Nefertari
 Ahmose-Sitkamose (or Sitkamose), (fl. c. late-16th century BC), princess and queen; probably daughter of Pharaoh Kamose and wife of Ahmose I
 Ahmose (fl. c. mid-16th century BC), royal queen of Thutmose I, and mother of queen and later, pharaoh, Hatshepsut

Other royalty
 Ahmose (18th dynasty) (fl. c. late 15th century BC), probably a son of Amenhotep II; High Priest of Re
 Ahmose (princess) (fl. c. mid-16th century BC), daughter of pharaoh Tao
 Ahmose-ankh (fl. c. mid-16th century BC), son of Pharaoh Ahmose I and queen Ahmose Nefertari
 Ahmose-Henutemipet (fl. c. late-16th century BC), daughter of Pharaoh Tao and probably Queen Ahhotep I
 Ahmose-Meritamon (17th dynasty) (fl. c. late-16th century BC), probably daughter of Seqenenre Tao
 Ahmose-Nebetta (fl. c. mid-16th century BC), probably daughter of Seqenenre Tao
 Ahmose Sapair (fl. c. mid-16th century BC), probably son of Pharaoh Tao
 Ahmose-Sitamun (or Sitamun), (fl. c. late-16th century BC), daughter of Pharaoh Ahmose I
 Ahmose-Tumerisy (fl. c. mid-16th century BC), probably daughter of pharaoh Tao

Officials
 Ahmose (or Ahmes), (fl. c. mid-17th century BC), an ancient Egyptian scribe who wrote the Rhind Mathematical Papyrus, a work of mathematics
 Ahmose, son of Ebana (fl. c. 1555 BC – c. 1500 BC); served in the Egyptian military
 Ahmose Pen-Nekhebet (fl. c. 1530 BC – c. 1470 BC), an ancient Egyptian official and military commander
 Ahmose, scribe (fl. c. 1354 BC – 1337 BC), owner of Amarna Tomb 3

Ancient Egyptian given names
Theophoric names